Dennis Anthony Robbins (born August 23, 1949) is an American musician who first made himself known as a guitarist in the band Rockets. After his departure from The Rockets, he began a career in country music, recording three major-label albums and several singles of his own, in addition to writing hit singles for Highway 101, Shenandoah and Garth Brooks.

Biography
Robbins was born in Hazelwood, North Carolina on August 23, 1949. He learned to play guitar while in his teens, taking his influences from both rock & roll and bluegrass. After a brief stint in the United States Marine Corps, he moved to Detroit, Michigan, where he found work in several bands before joining a group known as Rockets.

After retiring from Rockets, Robbins moved to Nashville, Tennessee, where he was signed to MCA in 1986, recording his debut album The First of Me that year. Later the same year, he founded the supergroup Billy Hill with songwriters Bob DiPiero and John Scott Sherrill. This group recorded one album on Reprise Records and charted three singles before disbanding in 1990. The three members of Billy Hill also co-wrote "The Church on Cumberland Road", a Number One single for Shenandoah in early 1989, and Highway 101's "(Do You Love Me) Just Say Yes."

Solo career & Billy Hill
After retiring from Rockets, Robbins moved to Nashville, Tennessee, where he was signed to MCA in 1986, recording his debut album The First of Me that year. Later, as success was starting to lack on him, he founded the supergroup Billy Hill with songwriters Bob DiPiero and John Scott Sherrill. This group recorded one album on Reprise Records and charted three singles before disbanding in 1990. The three members of Billy Hill also co-wrote "The Church on Cumberland Road", a Number One single for Shenandoah in early 1989, and Highway 101's "(Do You Love Me) Just Say Yes."

Giant Records, a subsidiary label of Warner, opened a country music branch in 1990, and Robbins was the first act signed to this newly formed division. Also that year, he contributed to another Number One single, when Garth Brooks topped the country music charts with "Two of a Kind, Workin' on a Full House" (which Robbins himself had charted with three years previous).

Robbins' second album overall, Man With a Plan, was issued in 1992. Included on it was the single "Home Sweet Home", his only solo Top 40 hit on the country charts. Also found on this album was his own rendition of "I Am Just a Rebel" (which was later cut by both Confederate Railroad and Joy Lynn White), as well as the track "Paris, Tennessee", which was later cut by both Kenny Chesney and Tracy Lawrence. In 1993, he was named one of the New Faces of Country Music by the Country Radio Seminar.

A second album for Giant, Born Ready, was issued in 1994, producing one more chart single "Mona Lisa On Cruise Control" (#68). He has not recorded any more albums ever since.

Songwriting
A few other of Robbins' penned material were later cut by other artists, such as: "Finally Friday" was recorded by Earl Thomas Conley on his 1988 album The Heart of It All and also by George Jones on his 1992 album Walls Can Fall.

"No Chance To Dance" was first cut by Johnny Rodriguez in 1988 for his album Gracias and his version was released as a single in early 1989, but it peaked at No. 72 on the Billboard country singles chart. Then, Robbins later cut the song along with the co-writers of the song (Bob DiPiero and John Scott Sherrill) when they formed Billy Hill and it was released as a single in 1990, but their version didn't reach the charts. And then Highway 101 recorded the song in 1993 for their album The New Frontier, but their version wasn't released as a single.

"Too Much Month at the End of the Money" was originally cut by Robbins when he formed the band Billy Hill, it peaked at No. 25 on Billboard in 1989 and it was later cut by Marty Stuart on his 2003 album Country Music, and he too would release it as a single where it would at No. 54.

The Church on Cumberland Road was first recorded by Robbins in 1987, which served as the B-side to his MCA single Two of a Kind, Workin' on a Full House, which would later become a No. 1 hit for Garth Brooks, Cumberland Road would later become a No. 1 hit for the band Shenandoah in 1989.

Discography

Albums

Singles

Music videos

Chart Singles written by Dennis Robbins

The following is a list of Dennis Robbins compositions that were chart hits.

References

External links
Dennis Robbins on Myspace

American country guitarists
American male guitarists
American country singer-songwriters
Living people
Singer-songwriters from North Carolina
Slide guitarists
Giant Records (Warner) artists
Guitarists from North Carolina
The Rockets (band) members
Country musicians from North Carolina
American male singer-songwriters
1949 births